"You Were the Last High" is a song by American alternative rock band The Dandy Warhols. It was released in July 2003 as the second single from their fourth studio album Welcome to the Monkey House.

Music video 

The music video is an almost exact recreation of Duran Duran's "Planet Earth" video: this was influenced by the fact that Nick Rhodes, keyboardist for Duran Duran, produced Welcome to the Monkey House.

Release 

Released in July 2003 as the second single from Welcome to the Monkey House, "You Were the Last High" peaked at No. 34 on the UK Singles Chart.

"You Were the Last High" was one of the titular "nine songs" in the film 9 Songs, which featured a live performance of the song by the band. The song also featured in the film Lara Croft Tomb Raider: The Cradle of Life.

"You Were the Last High" appeared on the band's greatest hits album The Capitol Years 1995–2007 under the shortened title "The Last High".

Reception 

The song was favorably received by critics, who generally cited it as a highlight of Welcome to the Monkey House. Pitchfork, in their otherwise negative review of Welcome to the Monkey House, called the track a "bright spot".

Of the track, Dandy Warhols guitarist Peter Holmström has said, "I think it's the best song we've ever done."

Track listing 
CD 1

CD 2

 "You Were the Last High"
 "Sun"
 "Dye"

Limited edition 7" vinyl

 "You Were the Last High"
 "We Used to Be Friends (Kenn Richards Remix)"

References

External links
 
 

The Dandy Warhols songs
2003 singles
Songs written by Courtney Taylor-Taylor
2003 songs
Capitol Records singles
Synth-pop songs